Convolvulus cneorum, the silverbush or shrubby bindweed, is a species of flowering plant in the family Convolvulaceae, which contains many plants described as "bindweed". The Latin specific epithet cneorum is a word of Greek origin referring to a small olive-like plant, possibly a species of Daphne.

Description
Unlike other species in the genus, it is an evergreen shrub rather than a vine, forming a low mound  in height, with a similar spread. It produces many pink buds unfurling to white  diameter flowers which are white with a yellow throat. These appear at the end of stems in loose panicles and may almost completely cover the plants for a long period from spring to the summer months. The leaves are grey-green and are covered in fine hairs which give the plant a silvery appearance.

Distribution
The species is found in coastal areas of Spain, Italy, Croatia and Albania In Italy it is found on the coast of Tuscany and western Sicily and on the islands of Capri and Li Galli. In Croatia it is found on many of the islands off the coast. It is often found growing in cracks in rocks.

Cultivation
The species prefers an alkaline soil, full sun and good drainage. It tolerates near-drought conditions for short periods, and is cold hardy to −9 C. It has gained the Royal Horticultural Society's Award of Garden Merit (confirmed 2017).

References 

cneorum
Flora of Albania
Flora of Croatia
Flora of Italy
Flora of Sicily
Flora of Spain
Ornamental plants
Plants described in 1753
Taxa named by Carl Linnaeus